Mazapa de Madero is a town and one of the 119 Municipalities of Chiapas, in southern Mexico.

As of 2010, the municipality had a total population of 7,793, up from 7,180 as of 2005. It covers an area of 116.8 km2.

As of 2010, the town of Mazapa de Madero had a population of 1,580. Other than the town of Mazapa de Madero, the municipality had 52 localities, none of which had a population over 1,000.

References

Municipalities of Chiapas